Albert Pierre Camille Peyronnet (5 January 1862 – 18 December 1958) was a French politician who was a senator from 1912 to 1945 and Minister of Labor in 1922–24.

Life

Albert Pierre Camille Peyronnet was born on 5 January 1862 in Brest, Finistère.
His father was a secondary school principal, who soon moved to the lycée of Montluçon.
From there Peyronnet went on to study at the faculty of law in Paris, the School of Political Science and the School of Business and Economics.
He became an advocate in Cosne-sur-Loire, a magistrate in Paris, and then an advocate in Paris.
He was deputy chief of staff of René Viviani, Minister of Labor from 1906 to 1908, then  Viviani's chief of staff until 1909.
He was chief of staff of Louis Puech, Minister of Public Works, Posts and Telegraphs from 1910 to 1911, then chief of staff of Ernest Monis, Minister of Worship in March-June 1911.

Peyronnet was elected senator for the Allier on 7 January 1912, and was reelected in 1921, 1929 and 1938.
He joined the Democratic Left group.
He was vice-president of the Senate from January 1925 to January 1929.
He was appointed Minister of Labor in the 2nd cabinet of Raymond Poincaré from 15 January 1922 to 29 March 1924.
He supported shorter working days in return for the gains in efficiency that were assumed to result.
He claimed that the eight-hour day led "to suburbanization, the increase of workers' gardens, greater attendance at professional courses and libraries, and the decline of alcoholism."

During World War II (1939–45) Peyronnet voted on 10 July 1940 in favor of the constitutional change that gave full powers to Marshal Philippe Pétain.
He then retired from public life.
He died on 18 December 1958 in Nice at the age of 96.

Publications

 Peyronnet's book Ministère du Travail 1906–1923 was crowned by the Academy of Moral and Political Sciences.

References

1862 births
1958 deaths
French Senators of the Third Republic
French Ministers of Labour and Social Affairs
Politicians from Brest, France
Senators of Allier